Ghuraba al-Sham ( Ghurabā' ash-Shām, "Strangers/Foreigners of the region of Syria") was a group of jihadists of Turkish and former Eastern bloc origin who smuggled foreign fighters to Iraq, intervened in Lebanon during the 2007 Lebanon conflict, and fought in Syria during the Syrian civil war. The group coordinated with Al-Nusra Front in clashes with the People's Protection Units in November 2012 and in January 2013. The group apparently shut down or disappeared in 2014.

Structure
The group was founded by Aleppo preacher Mahmud al-Aghasi, who was also known as Abu al-Qaqa. He was often accused by Syrian opposition parties of working for the Mukhabarat and during the 2007 Lebanon conflict he was known as the Godfather of Fatah al-Islam. The group was widely believed by many Lebanese people to be smuggling fighters to Iraq during the Iraq War and later to the Nahr al-Bared refugee camp to help Fatah al-Islam under the alleged auspice of the Syrian government. Abu al-Qaqa was killed in Aleppo by a former prisoner who was held by Americans during the Iraq War on 28 September 2007. Members of the group were recruited in Syria and sent to Iraq to fight during the Iraq War.

See also
List of armed groups in the Syrian Civil War

References

External links

Anti-government factions of the Syrian civil war
Jihadist groups
Terrorism in Syria